Thiollierea lenormandii is a species of flowering plant in the family Rubiaceae. It is endemic to New Caledonia.

References

leonrmandii
Endemic flora of New Caledonia
Endangered plants
Taxonomy articles created by Polbot